Ernest Baker may refer to:
 King Ernest Baker (1939–2000), American blues and soul singer and jazz musician
 Ernest Hamlin Baker (1889–1975), American artist and illustrator
 Ernest A. Baker (1869–1941), English author and editor